"Bad Behaviour" is the second single from Irish pop duo Jedward's second studio album, Victory. The single was released on 1 July 2011 in Ireland, and 4 July 2011 in the UK. The single peaked at #1 on the Irish Singles Chart.

Music video
The music video for "Bad Behaviour" premiered on YouTube on 29 June 2011. The video was filmed on 14 May 2011 and was directed by American music video director Rage. With a premise inspired by the films Home Alone and Risky Business, John and Edward play two brothers who throw a chaotic party when their parents go away for the weekend. The video received its first television play on 4Music on 30 June. American gossip blogger Perez Hilton makes a cameo appearance in the video.

Track listing

Chart performance

Release history

References

2011 singles
2010 songs
Jedward songs
Irish Singles Chart number-one singles